The Davis Guards Medal was a military award presented by the citizens of Houston to each of the participants a few weeks after the battle of Sabine Pass (September 8, 1863). Father Quesart, in charge of the Catholic Church in Houston during the American Civil War, started the project by popular subscription.

History 
The Davis Guards Medal was presented by the citizens of Houston a few weeks after the battle of Sabine Pass (September 8, 1863) to the members of Company F (Davis Guards), 1st (Cook's) Texas Heavy Artillery Regiment; Second Lieutenant N. W. Smith, Engineer Corps; and Assistant Surgeon George H. Bailey. Some time later, President Jefferson Davis also visited that locality, and the Davis Guards had another medal made and presented it to him.

Appearance 
The obverse of the Davis Guards Medal consisted of a Mexican silver dollar, each side smoothed off and engraved like a love token with the letters " D G ", below which is a rude cross of the form known as cross pattée. The reverse of the medal bore the inscription in three lines " Sabine Pass " / " Sept. 8th " / " 1863 " in cursive script. Border, on each side, a line, about one-eighth of an inch from the edge, from which groups of oblique lines extend to the edge. Loop for suspension.

Museum exhibitions and displays 
Three of the medals are known to exist. These are on display at the American Civil War Museum, Bullock Museum, and Texas Military Forces Museum.

Recipients 
Below is a list of recipients of the Davis Guards Medal. On February 8, 1864, all members of the artillery company also received the "thanks of Congress."

 Patrick Abbott
 George H. Bailey
 Michael Carr
 Abner R. Carter
 Patrick Clair
 James Corcoran
 Hugh Deagan
 Michael Delaney
 Thomas Daughtery
 Jefferson Davis (Honorary)
 John A. Drummond
 Daniel Donovan
 Richard W. Dowling
 Michael Eagan
 David Fitzgerald
 Patrick Fitzgerald
 James Fleming
 John Flood
 William Gleason
 John Hassott
 James Higgins
 Timothy Hurley
 John Hennessey
 Thomas Hagerty
 Timothy Huggins
 William Hardin
 W. L. Jett
 Patrick Malone
 Thomas McKernon
 John McKeever
 Alexander McCabe
 Timothy McDonough
 Patrick McDonnell
 John McGrath
 John McNealis
 Daniel McMurray
 Michael Monoghan
 Richard O'Hara
 Laurence Plunkett
 Edward Pritchard
 Maurice Powers
 Charles Rheins
 N. W. Smith
 Thomas Sullivan
 Michael Sullivan
 Patrick Sullivan
 Matthew Walsh
 Jack W. White
 John Wesley
 Joseph Wilson

See also 
 List of military decorations

Notes

References 

1863 establishments in the Confederate States of America
Awards established in 1863
Campaign medals
Confederate States Army
Texas in the American Civil War
History of Houston
Military awards and decorations of the American Civil War